Peepal Farm is a not for profit, non-governmental organisation located in Dhanotu village, nearby Dharamshala in Himachal Pradesh, India. The group works for the improvement of life conditions of the stray animal population, especially cows and dogs, and raising public awareness against animal cruelty.

History 
Peepal Farm was started in December 2014 by Robin Singh and Joellen Anderson in Himachal Pradesh's Dhanotu village near the Dharamsala Town, who were then joined by the third co-founder Shivani Bhalla.

Immediately before, the trio had been running a sterilization program for stray dogs in New Delhi. The idea stemmed from the limitations of animal welfare work, and they decided to do it in a way that involves and inspires others. In the year 2015, once the primary construction was complete, the farm was open to people to volunteer and work in exchange of lodging and vegan meals. Since that time, farm has helped many animals heal, find homes or pass on peacefully.

Being the only place where large animals can recover in the area, the local administration regularly refers cases to Peepal Farm since 2017. In the animal recovery center approximately 30 animals are in various stages of recovery at any given time. Both traditional medicines like Ayurveda and modern allopathy are used for treatment. The farm produces organic products. Volunteers organize art projects to spread awareness for kindness towards animals.

References

External links 

 Official website

Organisations based in Himachal Pradesh
Vegetarian organizations
Veganism
Animal welfare organisations based in India
2014 establishments in Himachal Pradesh
Organizations established in 2014